Jordan Iain Houston (born 28 January 2000) is a Scottish footballer, who currently plays for Ayr United. Houston previously played for Rangers and Airdrieonians, and has represented Scotland in youth international matches.

Career
Houston signed a two-year contract with Rangers on 17 July 2018, keeping him with the club until the summer of 2020. Houston made his professional debut for Rangers when he came on as a substitute in a Scottish Cup win over Cowdenbeath on 30 January 2019. He was loaned to League One club Airdrieonians in February 2019.

Houston was loaned to Championship club Ayr United on 30 August 2019. He moved to Ayr on a permanent basis in January 2020.

Houston has also represented Scotland in under-17 and under-19 internationals.

References

External links

2000 births
Living people
Sportspeople from East Kilbride
Footballers from South Lanarkshire
Scottish footballers
Association football defenders
Rangers F.C. players
Airdrieonians F.C. players
Ayr United F.C. players
Scottish Professional Football League players
Scotland youth international footballers